The 1867 Massachusetts gubernatorial election was held on November 5.

Governor Alexander Bullock was re-elected to a third term in office, defeating Democrat John Quincy Adams II.

Republican nomination

Candidates
John Albion Andrew, former Governor (1861–65)
Alexander Bullock, incumbent Governor since 1865
William Claflin, Lieutenant Governor and chairman of the Republican National Committee
Henry L. Dawes, U.S. Representative from Pittsfield
George B. Loring, State Representative from Salem
F. E. Parker
Joseph Adams Pond, President of the Massachusetts Senate
Alexander H. Rice, U.S. Representative from Boston

Results
There was a motion to re-nominate Bullock by acclamation, but it was rejected and withdrawn. Nonetheless, Bullock easily won on the first ballot against scattered opposition.

General election

Candidates
John Quincy Adams II, State Representative from Quincy (Democratic)
Alexander Bullock, incumbent Governor

Results

See also
 1867 Massachusetts legislature

References

Governor
1867
Massachusetts
November 1867 events